Nazi archaeology was a field of pseudoarcheology led and encouraged by various Nazi leaders and Ahnenerbe figures, such as Adolf Hitler and Heinrich Himmler, which directed archaeologists and other scholars to search Germany's archeological past in order to find material evidence supporting an advanced, Aryan ancestry as alleged and espoused by the ultranationalist Nazi Party.

Overview
The search for a strong, nationalistic, Aryan-centric national prehistory of Germany began after Germany's loss in World War I in 1918, in which during this time, the country faced a severe economic crisis due to the terms brought on by the Treaty of Versailles. One of the leading experts who engaged in research and study in search of the German prehistory was German philologist and archeologist Gustaf Kossinna, with his ideas and theories being picked up and further researched by the Nazi organizations Amt Rosenberg and Ahnenerbe. With specialization in researching German prehistory as well as Hitler being able to provide funds from the Nazi Party into the study of German prehistory, the Nazis were able to add pseudoarchaeology into its extensive propaganda campaigns of the German people, presenting Germany as the beginnings of civilization.

Tenets
 The Kulturkreis ("culture circles") theory, originally by German ethnologists Fritz Graebner, but used in studies by Gustaf Kossinna, stated that recognition of an ethnic region is based on the material culture excavated from an archeological site. This theory was used by the Nazis to justify takeover and occupation of foreign lands such as Poland and Czechoslovakia. One such example of Kulturkreis is shown in Kossinna's article "The German Ostmark", in which Kossinna argued that Poland should be a part of the German Reich, since any lands where an artifact was titled "Germanic" were therefore ancient Germanic territory, in which the artifacts had been "wrongfully stolen" by "barbarians".
 The Social Diffusion Theory, which stated that cultural diffusion occurred through a process whereby influences, ideas and models were passed on by more advanced peoples to the less advanced whom they came into contact with. Examples offered by Kossinna and Alfred Rosenberg presented a history of Germany equivalent to that of the Roman Empire, suggesting that "Germanic people were never destroyers of culture—not like the Romans—and the French in recent times." Combined with Nazi ideology, this theory gave the perfect foundation for the view of Germany as the locomotive of world civilization.
 Weltanschauungswissenschaften or "World View Sciences", which stated that culture and science were as one, and carried certain "race-inherent values". The theory suggested that older cultural models, such as sagas, stories and legends, should be not only reincorporated into mainstream culture, but that "the guiding principle in Germany must be to emphasise the high cultural level and the cultural self-sufficiency of the Germanic people." Examples were the use of Aryan-styled regalia such as the swastika, the use of German legends and runic symbols in the SS, and the ideas proposed by German scientists and the conclusions they made were more accurate than the views of "lesser-race" scientists.
 Deutsche Reinheit, or "Pure German Man", argues the idea that Germans were "pure Aryans" who had survived a natural catastrophe and evolved a highly developed culture during their long migration to Germany. This tenet also makes the argument that Greeks were actually Germanic, claiming evidence that certain "Indogermanic" artifacts could be found in Greece. This theory supported the Kulturkreise theory tangentally, in that archeologists who did not approve of the uses of Kulturkreise theory (moderates) could support this theory.
 The Ahnenerbe and its own role as an organization with the purpose of using its archeological "findings" to further support the propaganda machine of the Nazi regime through the use of previously listed tenets presented and built on by German archeologists such as Kossinna.

Organisations and operations

Ahnenerbe

The Ahnenerbe Organisation, formally the Deutsches Ahnenerbe – Studiengesellschaft für Geistesurgeschichte (German Ancestry - Research Society for Ancient Intellectual History ) was an organization started as the Research Institute for the Prehistory of Mind and was connected to the SS in 1935 by Walther Darre. In 1936 it was attached to Hitler's Reichsführer-SS and led by chief of police Heinrich Himmler. By 1937, it was the primary instrument of Nazi archaeology and archaeological propaganda, subsuming smaller organisations like Reinerth's Archaeology Group, and filling its ranks with "investigators". These included people like Herman Wirth, co-founder of the Ahnernerbe, who attempted to prove that Northern Europe was the cradle of Western civilization.

The main goals of the organisation were:

 To study the territory, ideas and achievements of the Indo-Germanic people
 To bring the research findings to life and present them to the German people
 To encourage every German to get involved in the organisation.

Although the organisation claimed to have a research goal, Himmler had no official training in archaeology and was known for his interest in mysticism and the occult.  Himmler defined the organisation as working towards a prehistory that would prove the pre-eminence of the Germans and their Germanic predecessors since the beginning of civilization. He is quoted as saying, "A nation lives happily in the present and the future so long as it is aware of its past and the greatness of its ancestors."

The Ahnenerbe had difficulty finding scientists to work on the projects and was run largely by scholars from branches of the humanities, which made their research both unskilled and less professional.  The group went on to be responsible for pseudoarchaeology, illustrated by open-air displays honoring Germanic heritage such as the Externsteine, a sandstone formation that was thought to have been a key Germanic cult site. Another example is the Sachsenhain, where 4500 Saxons were executed as a punishment for Widukind's uprising.  This site was used as an idealised shrine that was considered sacred to the Germanic people and highlighting their readiness for self-sacrifice.

Although there were other sites researched by Ahnernerbe, many of them were censored from the public since they did not have the correct Germanic interpretations.  The sites chosen for excavations were limited to those of Germanic superiority such as Erdenburg, where the Ahnenerbe claimed to have clear evidence of the victorious campaign of the Germani against the Romans.

Some of the Ahnenerbe's most extravagant activities include:

 Edmund Kiss tried to travel to Bolivia in 1928 to study the ruins of temples in the Andes mountains. He claimed their similarity to ancient European construction indicated they were designed by Nordic migrants that had arrived at the area millions of years earlier.
 In 1938, Franz Altheim and his research partner Erika Trautmann requested the Ahnenerbe sponsor their Middle East trek to study an internal power struggle of the Roman Empire, which they believed was fought between the Nordic and Semitic peoples.
 In 1936 an Ahnenerbe expedition visited the German island of Rügen and then Sweden, with the objective of examining rock-art which they concluded was 'proto-Germanic'.
 Nazi theorists took a huge interest in the Bayeux Tapestry, going so far as to attempt archaeological digs to find other contemporary artwork that would support their assertion of Germanic might.
 In 1938 the Ahnenerbe sent an expedition to Tibet with the intention of proving Aryan superiority by confirming the Vril theory, which was based on Edward Bulwer-Lytton's book Vril, the Power of the Coming Race. Their study included measuring the skulls of 376 people and comparing native feature to those associated with Aryans, with the expedition's most scientific findings abeing associated with biological findings.

Amt Rosenberg
The Amt Rosenberg was an organization dedicated to finding archeological evidence of the superiority of Germanic culture and of Atlantis, headed by Alfred Rosenberg, and was given plenty of support by the Thule Society, with support given back in turn to the society by the organization. A small, better trained team of archaeologists, with more concrete backgrounds and training with archeology, was led by Rosenberg and part of his Amt Rosenberg organization, the Reichsbund für Deutsche Vorgeschichte. It was staffed with archaeologists who signed on to some of Rosenberg's later thinking and theory. Rosenberg saw world history as shaped by the eternal fight between the 'Nordic Atlantic', the pure-blooded Nordic people of Atlantis, and the 'Semites', or Jewish people. To him, only the Germanic people brought culture to the world, while Jews brought evil. He speculated that the people of Germany were survivors from Atlantis who had migrated to Germany, seeing the German people as a distinct race, not only in biological terms, but also in mental phenomena and in their 'will to live'. Hence, he advocated 'race materialism', stating that only the fittest race (Aryans) should survive, a tenet that would later shape the Nazi policy on the Final Solution.

Goals of Nazi archaeology

To the public
Nazi archaeology was rarely conducted with an eye to pure research, but was instead used as a propaganda tool designed to both generate nationalistic pride in the German people and provide scientific excuses for hostile takeovers. The German people were drawn to the idea of Germany as the site of the origins of civilization by several means. For one, there were a series of films put out by Lothar Zotz with titles like Threatened by the Steam Plough, Germany's Bronze Age, The Flames of Prehistory and On the Trail of the Eastern Germans, all of which delved further into the supposed prehistory of the German peoples. These used the appeal of myths, the glory of the ancient past, and German triumph over change to reinforce the idea that German history was something to be proud of, while at the same time taking advantage of the fact that since these periods of history were not well known to the general public and thus could include heavy doses of propaganda.

Additionally, public journals gained popularity such as Die Kunde (The Message) and Germanen-Erbe (Germanic Heritage). With the journals and films, the German people thought they were being given good visuals and interpretations of different archaeological sites and learning more about 'true' German prehistory.

The Nazis also pushed the public to get involved in the search for the past, using the appeal of patriotism as a tool. For example, the membership flyer of one amateur organization of the Amt Rosenberg stated, "Responsibility with respect to our indigenous prehistory must again fill every German with pride!" The goal of the organization was also stated as, "the interpretation and dissemination of unclassified knowledge regarding the history and cultural achievements of our northern Germanic ancestors on German and foreign soil."

Along with appealing to public patriotism, there were open-air museums that reconstructed Neolithic and Bronze Age lake settlements at Unteruhldingen. These public museums gained immense popularity among the general public, and pushed the people to believe in and search for their Germanic past.

All of these pieces put together would create a solid foundation of Germanic pride in the German people that was used to reinforce the nationalistic, fascist message Adolf Hitler was crafting with his speeches, open-air meetings, and public image.

To archaeologists
Prior to the formation of the Ahnenerbe, there was little funding for or interest in Germanic archaeology.  This allowed for the Nazi Party to easily rouse interest in the subject among the general public, which in turn made it easier to push their ethnocentric views onto the uninformed public. Another side effect of this sudden support was felt in some scholarly circles, since many German scholars who specialized in archaeology had long been envious of the advancements in archaeology their European neighbors had made during their excavations in the Middle East. With the sudden boom in interest, the scholars were finally able to put their knowledge to work.

Because of Hitler, many changes occurred; funds were made available for scholars to make great advancements beyond their neighboring countries. Under Nazi rule, archaeology went from having one chair in prehistory in Marburg in 1933 to having nine chairs in the Reich in 1935. Once archaeology started gaining popularity, scholars were able to partake in much grander projects, such as the excavation of castles, old ruins, and  bring back pieces for display in museums.

One specific example of these changes was that the Römisch-Germanisches Zentralmuseum (Romano-Germanic Central Museum) in Mainz, which, in 1939, became for a time the Zentralmuseum für deutsche Vor- und Frühgeschichte (Central museum for German pre- and early history). (Note the difference between the original "Römisch-Germanisch" which denotes a historical period, and "deutsche", implying a continuous history of a united group of  people. "Anglo-Saxon" and "English" would be rough analogies.)

In their enthusiasm for the Nazi regime's support of archaeology, many German archaeologists became pawns and puppets of the real goals behind the movement. They answered to the requests of the Ahnenerbe, and not always in the interests of true archaeology.

The Search for Atlantis
In their search to prove the superiority of the Aryan race, the Nazi party began searching the world for archeological evidence that would prove to the rest of the "inferior" world that the German people were not only a superior race, but that they transcended traditional human standards. One archeological exploit made popular by the movie Raiders of the Lost Ark was the search for the Ark of the Covenant. Another, perhaps less known, exploit was their attempt to discover the lost island of Atlantis. This project, originally headed by Herman Wirth and later taken over by Heinrich Himmler, was a search that lasted for nearly the entire reign of the Third Reich under Adolf Hitler's regime. Wirth did not aspire to the widely held belief that Atlantis was located in the Mediterranean, but rather that it was located somewhere in the North Atlantic region. In Wirth's depiction, Atlantis was a civilization that reached its height approximately 25,000 years before the modern era and was the birthplace of the Nordic race that was destined to control and influence the development of mankind and to act as their sovereign masters, with the Nordic race Wirth mentioned being the Aryan race. Soon after his rise to popularity, some members of the highest echelons in Nazi Germany began to acknowledge the supposed "truth" behind his bizarre pseudoscientific ideas.

In the year 1935, Heinrich Himmler began a joint effort with Wirth to establish the Ahnenerbe, an elite team of Schutzstaffel (SS) archeologists, scientists, and historians gathered to search sacred archeological sites around the globe for evidence that the Aryans of Atlantis were not a mere work of Nazi propaganda. Himmler desperately wanted to prove that their existence was real and verifiable. As head of the SS, Himmler was enthralled with the prospect of archeological proof to verify and confirm Nazi beliefs. Himmler was also one of the staunchest supporters of archeological discovery by the Nazi party, especially those made within the realm of pre-historic Germany. After the Ahnenerbe was formed, they began work on excavation and research into ancient archeological sites, paying especially close attention to those that were believed to be of sacred significance to their ancestors. One particularly significant excavation took place under the command of Nazi archaeologist Vilhelm Toit. This excavation took place at the Externsteine. The goal of this excursion to the Externsteine was to find evidence that it had been used for sacred ritualistic practices by the ancient Aryan people of Germany thousands of years before it became a significant site to Christianity. During the search for ancient Aryan purity, the Externsteine became a symbol to the people of Nazi Germany; a symbol of pure German blood and ancestry. As the Externsteine excavations continued, they became Himmler's personal pet project. Shortly after the Externsteine was sealed off to the public for archeological research, rumors began to surface that the people of Germany were not, in fact, of Aryan descent. Faced with this, Himmler began to send teams of his Ahnenerbe researchers across the world to hunt for proof that such claims were false, although he and his expeditions ultimately failed to provide such further evidence.

Haus Atlantis
In the city of Bremen, Germany stands a unique example of German architecture designed by Bernhard Hoetger and inspired by a fascination with ideas by Herman Wirth that the lost city of Atlantis was originally inhabited by Germanics, thereby making Germans the oldest known race on earth.  "Haus Atlantis" or "Atlantis House" was completed in 1931 and was designed with the sole purpose of studying Atlantis and its relation to the Aryan race. The façade of the building was originally adorned by a carved wooden feature depicting the Nordic God Odin (also referred to as "The Atlantis Survivor") crucified on the tree of life. It was destroyed by fire during WWII and was not recreated when the façade was rebuilt in 1954. The architectural masterpiece is composed mostly of glass and steel. Many historians believe that the choice of materials in combination with the interior architecture was intended to represent the Aryan exodus from Atlantis. At the top of the institute there is a room named "The Heaven's Hall.” This room, at the peak of the building, served as a teaching forum for young Nazi archeologists where they could eagerly absorb the teachings of esteemed German figures such as Herman Wirth and Hans Reinerth, along with their theories of the Germanic presence in Atlantis.

Notable figures

Gustaf Kossinna
The nationalistic theories of Gustaf Kossinna about the origins and racial superiority of Germanic peoples influenced many aspects of Nazi ideology and politics. He is also considered to be a precursor of Nazi archaeology. Kossinna was trained as a linguist at universities in Göttingen, Leipzig, Berlin, and Strasbourg, and eventually held the chair for Germanic Archeology at the University of Berlin. He laid the groundwork for an ethnocentric German prehistory with one of his theories, the Kulturkreis theory, being the basis on which the main pillars of Nazi archaeology were founded. Kossinna also published books for a general audience which were useful tools to spread German propaganda and created archaeological expeditions that allowed the Nazis to use Kulturkreis theory as an excuse for territorial expansion. In one of his most popular books, Die deutsche Vorgeschichte — eine hervorragend nationale Wissenschaft (German Prehistory: a Pre-eminently National Discipline), Kossinna puts forward the idea of an Aryan race, the Germani, superior to all other peoples, and shows Germany as the key to an unwritten history. The book was used to inspire the German people into the belifs of the Nazi Party regarding the origins and history of the German people, with the dedication in the beginning reading, "To the German people, as a building block in the reconstruction of the externally as well as internally disintegrated fatherland." Kossinna died in 1931, 13 months before Hitler seized power.

Alfred Rosenberg

Alfred Rosenberg was a Nazi Party ideologist who supported archeological excavations and the study of provincial Roman Germany. He stated as a summary of his research and thoughts that "An individual to whom the tradition of his people and the honor of his people is not a supreme value, has forfeited the right to be protected by that people." Rosenberg's perspective on German prehistory led mainly to racist distortion of data which did not directly apply to the Germanic people. Rosenberg's book Der Mythos des 20. Jahrhunderts (The Myth of the Twentieth Century) gave support to the concept of a new Germanic religion. Rosenberg's theory, Weltanschauungswissenschaften, was implicit in the idea that Germany had the right to takeover other nations - or even exterminate them - since German culture was "superior" to the culture of other groups. He also tried to prove that the Nordic-Aryans originated on a lost landmass identified with Atlantis, and that Jesus was not a Jew but instead an Aryan Amorite.

Hans Reinerth
Hans Reinerth was the main archaeologist Rosenberg worked with. Reinerth is famous for his excavations at the Federsee and he saw the Nazi Party as a tool he could use to work his way up in society. This is just what occurred, and in 1934 Rosenberg appointed him to the position of "Reich Deputy of German Prehistory". This made him the spokesman for the "purification and Germanisation of the German prehistory". Reinerth was an adherent of Hitler's theory of German racial purity. Though this theory never really came into full effect, Reinerth pushed it heavily as Reich Deputy, and encouraged archaeological exploration. His archaeological group, along with the Ahnenerbe organization, was used to the Nazis' full advantage since it was a more "professional" group.

Herman Wirth
Herman Wirth was a Dutch-German historian who co-founded the SS organization called Ahnenerbe before being pushed out of the organization by Heinrich Himmler. Wirth began his career as a German soldier in 1914, when he volunteered for service in the German Army and monitored Flemish separatists in German-occupied Belgium. In 1917, after only two years of military service, he was decorated and dismissed from service. He was later appointed as a professor and researcher by Wilhelm II  and remained in the position until the fall of the Third Reich. Wirth believed that civilization was an affliction that could only be cured by a simpler way of life. Later in life, during the reign of the Third Reich, Wirth was the primary proponent for the idea that the German people descended from Atlantis, more specifically that they descended from Aryan Atlanteans who made a mass exodus from Atlantis at some point. While Wirth was a Nazi archaeologist, unlike others who worked with the Nazi Party, he was not well-liked by most of the Nazi Party and received criticism from such intellectuals as Bolko von Richthofen, Arthur Hübner, and even Hitler himself, who denounced the institute known as Haus Atlantis in Bremen's Böttcherstraße in his 1936 speech at the Reichsparteitag. This disgraceful career led Wirth to be mostly seen as a crank among the Nazi Party. However, Wirth made claims that what may have been his crowning achievement was never published. In 1979 Wirth was interviewed by Chilean neo-Nazi Miguel Serrano. In this interview, Wirth proclaimed that his magnum opus, Palestinabuch had been stolen. While there are indications that Wirth may have actually worked on this book, there is no solid evidence to support his claims. Whether the book actually existed or not, Wirth would never see it published, as he died in 1981 in Kusel, Germany. To this day, however, there are still many pseudoarchaeologists out there who seek to find the supposed lost final book of this once-famous Nazi Atlantis truther.

Other Nazi archaeologists
Erika Trautmann
Yrjö von Grönhagen
Assien Bohmers
Hans-Jürgen Eggers
Herbert Jankuhn
Gero von Merhart
Gotthard Neumann
Gustav Schwantes
Ernst Sprockhoff
Ernst Wahle
Wilhelm Unverzagt
Joachim Werner
Hans Zeiß
Werner Radig
Albert Funk
Ludwig Kohl-Larsen

See also
Nazi propaganda
Nationalism and archaeology
Ahnenerbe
 List of topics characterized as pseudoscience

References

External links
 Archaeological Organisations
 Hitler's Willing Archaeologists (How the SS perverted the Paleolithic record to support Nazi ideology) by Heather Pringle in Archaeology, Volume 59, Number 2, March/April 2006.
 A Nordic civilisation on the lost continent of Atlantis in The Daily Telegraph, May 3, 2006.

Science in Nazi Germany
Nazi SS
Occultism in Nazism
Pseudoarchaeology
Archaeology of Germany
Nationalism and archaeology
Archaeology and racism